Jameson Brooks (born November 25, 1985) is an American director, writer, and visual effects artist, best known for directing the 2018 film Bomb City, based on the true crime story of punk rocker Brian Deneke.

Early life
Brooks grew up in Amarillo, Texas on November 25, 1985. Brooks went to film school at the University of North Texas.

Career
Brooks' filmmaking career began when he purchased his first camcorder at age 16 and then filming his friends skateboard and BMX. After a few years of his work both behind the camera and on his bicycle, he started to appear in national television outlets that had shows featuring Action Sports, specifically Scarred, Blue Torch, and Shook Interactive Video Zine.

Currently, he is known for his narrative-driven, visual effects heavy music videos, commercials, and films.

Brooks co-owns the production company 3rd Identity.

Personal life

References

External links
 
 https://variety.com/2018/film/news/bomb-city-review-1202691227/
 https://www.vice.com/en_us/article/434agp/what-the-killing-of-a-punk-in-texas-says-about-america
 https://www.hollywoodreporter.com/review/bomb-city-1083150

1985 births
Living people
American film directors
People from Amarillo, Texas